Francis Nehemiah Bangs (February 23, 1828 – November 30, 1885) was a prominent lawyer and founder of the Wall Street law firm Davis Polk & Wardwell.

Biography
Bangs was born in New York City in 1828. His father, Nathan Bangs, was a well-known Methodist minister from Stratford, Connecticut. He studied at New York University and Yale Law School, where he graduated in 1847. He joined the bar in 1849 and practiced law with several partners before ultimately partnering with Francis Lynde Stetson to form the law firm Bangs & Stetson, a precursor to the modern firm of Davis Polk & Wardwell. Despite lifelong health problems, he developed a prosperous practice in New York representing large business interests, and came to prominence after being appointed counsel to the assignee of the dissolved law firm of Ketchum, Son & Co. in 1853. His practice grew further with the passage of the Federal Bankruptcy Act of 1867, the first bankruptcy act to cover corporations as well as individuals. He was a founding member of the New York City Bar Association, and its president from 1882 to 1883. His was the father of attorney and banker Francis S. Bangs and author and satirist John Kendrick Bangs.

Francis N. Bangs died in Ocala, Florida on November 30, 1885. He was buried at Green-Wood Cemetery.

References

1828 births
1885 deaths
19th-century American lawyers
Burials at Green-Wood Cemetery
Presidents of the New York City Bar Association
New York (state) lawyers
New York University alumni
Yale Law School alumni